WGSP could refer to two radio stations in the United States:

WGSP (AM), a radio station (1310 AM) licensed to Charlotte, North Carolina
WGSP-FM, a radio station (102.3 FM) licensed to Pageland, South Carolina